Bhadra is a 2011 Kannada action comedy film about a village boy who goes to college and falls in love with his classmate, who turns out be the sister of an underworld don. The film is a remake of the Telugu film Ranam.

Cast
Prajwal Devaraj as Bhadra 
Daisy Shah as Kavya 
Sharan 
Sampath Raj as Underworld Don Naga
Bullet Prakash
M.N.Lakshmi Devi
Sathyajith 
Mico Nagaraj 
Girish Shivanna 
Ramesh Bhat 
Yathi raj 
Akki Channabasappa 
Patre Nagaraj 
Chandrakala Mohan 
Mamatha Ravuth 
Rithesh 
Vijay Jatti 
Raghav Nag

Soundtrack 
Sri Guru composed the film's music. All the songs were copied from the original,without giving the credits to the original composer Mani Sharma.

Reception

Critical response 

A critic from News18 India wrote ""Bhadra" engages you throughout its length. It may be a high value entertainer for audiences who have not watched the original and can be an above average outing for the fans who have watched the remake. You may even watch it with your family members to have a few laughs". A critic from Sify.com wrote "Fights have been the major attraction in this film with Ravi Varma and Thriller Manju choreographing thrilling fights. The songs like 'Aa Chinna' and 'Madanaari Baale' are quite catchy. Jai Anand's camera work is another factor that is quite impressive. Sri Guru's work can only be commended for background music as all the song compositions are lifted from the original Telugu film".

References

External links
Bhadra at Oneindia

Kannada remakes of Telugu films
Indian action comedy films
Indian romantic comedy films
2011 films
2010s Kannada-language films
Films directed by Mahesh Rao